Suzie Agnes-Ida d'Auvergne  (1942 – 18 August 2014) was a Saint Lucian barrister and jurist. She was a High Court Judge of the Eastern Caribbean Supreme Court from 1990 to 2004.

D'Auvergne obtained a law degree at the University of London in 1972. She began her private law practice in 1975 and became a magistrate in 1979. She was Director of Public Prosecutions from 1982 to 1988 when she was appointed the first Solicitor General of Saint Lucia.

In 1990, d'Auvergne was appointed a High Court Judge of Eastern Caribbean Supreme Court. She retired in 2004. She was also a judge of the International Labour Organization Administrative Tribunal.

D'Auvergne received the Saint Lucia Medal of Honour for outstanding service in the cause of justice in 2004. In 2006, she was awarded the Companion of the Order of St Michael and St George (CMG) for service to the judiciary.

D'Auvergne died at Tapion Hospital in Castries on 18 August 2014.

References

1942 births
2014 deaths
Alumni of the University of London
Companions of the Order of St Michael and St George
Eastern Caribbean Supreme Court justices
Recipients of the Order of Saint Lucia
Saint Lucian judges
20th-century Saint Lucian lawyers
Saint Lucian women lawyers
Saint Lucian judges of international courts and tribunals